Jason Iain Flemyng (born 25 September 1966) is an English actor. He is known for roles in British films such as Lock, Stock and Two Smoking Barrels (1998) and Snatch (2000), both for Guy Ritchie, as well as Hollywood productions such as Rob Roy (1995), the Alan Moore comic book adaptations From Hell (2001) and The League of Extraordinary Gentlemen (2003), and The Curious Case of Benjamin Button (2008). He has also appeared in prominent roles in both theatre and television in the UK. Flemyng speaks French fluently, and has made three films in that language. He won the Best Actor Award at the Geneva Film Festival for his role in 1996's Alive and Kicking.

Early life and career
Flemyng was born on 25 September 1966 in Putney, London, the son of Scottish television and film director Gordon Flemyng. He decided he wanted to become an actor after appearing in theatrical productions at his school, Christ's Hospital in Sussex. "I always wanted to be an actor," he later told the BBC. "From the time I fancied a girl who played Dorothy in the school production of The Wizard of Oz. I auditioned for the role of the scarecrow so that I could have the most stage time with her, but she ended up running off with the tin man!"

In the 1980s, he was involved with the National Youth Theatre and the political organisation the Young Socialists. He also became involved with Militant, an entryist group active within the Labour Party, and in 1987 was expelled from Labour for selling the Militant newspaper. Flemyng has subsequently claimed that both his theatrical and political activities at this time were simply a way of meeting girls. In 1990 he was admitted to the London Academy of Music and Dramatic Art (LAMDA), where he was a classmate of Hermione Norris. Following his graduation from LAMDA in the early 1990s he joined the Royal Shakespeare Company.

Television and film work
One of his first prominent roles on screen was a guest appearance in the American television series The Young Indiana Jones Chronicles in 1992. He was then a regular in the ITV drama series Doctor Finlay from 1993 to 1996.

His first film appearance was in the 1994 version of The Jungle Book. His first major cinema role was in Angela Pope's 1996 drama Hollow Reed, where he played a child abuser, followed by a main role in Guy Ritchie's popular 1998 London gangster film Lock, Stock and Two Smoking Barrels. Flemyng later claimed to have lost so much money while playing poker with the film's backers in between takes on set that he had to work on the four days of re-shoots the film required for no fee. He went on to appear in films such as The Red Violin and Deep Rising (1998), Snatch (2000), George A. Romero's Bruiser (2000) and Rock Star (2001). Flemyng also starred in the short film Feeling Good, written by Dexter Fletcher, whom he met while working on Lock, Stock and Two Smoking Barrels.

In the early 2000s he featured in two big-budget Hollywood films which were adaptations of Alan Moore comic books; as John Netley in 2001's From Hell, with Johnny Depp, and 2003's The League of Extraordinary Gentlemen, with Sean Connery, in which Flemyng played Dr. Henry Jekyll and Edward Hyde. The latter film was a disappointment, but Flemyng commented that: "It was a bit of a nightmare... the film cost a fortune and didn't make back the money it was meant to... But I still get a huge kick out of doing films like that and From Hell. Any day you walk onto a set and Sean Connery or Johnny Depp or Brad Pitt is there has to be a good day."

In parallel with his film career, Flemyng has continued to take various television roles. He told BBC News Online in 2004 that: "Of the 40 feature films I've made, 15 of them failed to make it onto the screen and have only ever been seen by cast and crew. It is very frustrating when a film you really believe in remains unseen. That's not a problem with television. If you're a painter you don't paint a picture and then stick it under the bed – you want people to see it." In 2005 he played the famous science-fiction role of Professor Bernard Quatermass when digital television channel BBC Four produced a live remake of the 1953 serial The Quatermass Experiment. In 2005 he also played the part of Dimitry, a Russian ex-biological weapons specialist, in Transporter 2, where he was briefly reunited with Jason Statham.

In 2009, Flemyng joined the cast of the ITV science fiction cult drama series Primeval during its third series, as maverick ex-policeman Danny Quinn. He received top billing as the series' new star, taking over from Douglas Henshall. In March 2010 Flemyng earned a lead role as Cpl. Callow in the war/horror film The 4th Reich.

On 15 August 2010, it became public that he had been cast in the role of Azazel in the X-Men prequel, X-Men: First Class, directed by Matthew Vaughn.

In 2011, Flemyng reprised his character of Danny Quinn in the last episode of Primevals fourth series, it is said that he would return as Danny Quinn one last time before the finale of the shows fifth series.

In 2012, he starred in I Give It a Year (released in Feb 2013), as the bride's brother-in-law in a British romcom by Working Title.

After two years Jason just completed work on the feature film 'The Journey' on which he also serves as Producer, in which he plays Ozzy. The film was written especially for him and took two years to complete, it was filmed in Greece and London and is directed by Lance Nielsen In January 2015, Flemyng signed with UK-based Evolution Pictures to direct the vampire film Eat Locals.

Flemyng appears as himself in the 2018 short film To Trend on Twitter in aid of young people with cancer charity CLIC Sargent with comedians Reece Shearsmith, Steve Pemberton, Helen Lederer and David Baddiel.

In 2021, Audible released Flemyng's recording of William Gibson's acclaimed sci-fi novel Neuromancer.

Personal life
For nine years, Flemyng and actress Lena Headey were a couple; the relationship ended in 2001. Flemyng married Elly Fairman in the summer of 2008, in Tuscany, Italy. The pair have twin boys, Noah and Cassius, who were born in 2012. In 2020, Flemyng said they had all suffered from COVID-19.  Flemyng enjoys long-distance running and has completed several marathons. Flemyng is a supporter of Chelsea F.C.

Filmography

Film

Television

References

External links

1966 births
20th-century English male actors
21st-century English male actors
Alumni of the London Academy of Music and Dramatic Art
English male film actors
English male Shakespearean actors
English male stage actors
English male television actors
English people of Scottish descent
Living people
Male actors from London
National Youth Theatre members
People educated at Christ's Hospital
People from Putney
Royal Shakespeare Company members